Arthur August Schabinger (August 6, 1889 – October 13, 1972) was an American football and basketball coach and college athletics administrator. Schabinger is credited (although disputed) with throwing the first forward pass in college football history.  Even if it was not the first forward pass, most certainly Schabinger was one of the early adopters and innovators of the play.

Basketball achievements
Schabinger coached college basketball for 20 seasons, including stints with Ottawa University, Emporia Teachers College and Creighton University.  He was one of the founders of National Association of Basketball Coaches and the president of that organization in 1932. He authored the association's Constitution and By-Laws.  He was enshrined in the Basketball Hall of Fame as a contributor in 1961.

Football achievements

As a player
In 1910, Schabinger led the College of Emporia Presbies to a 17–0 victory over Washburn.  During this game, he threw what some have credited (but many other records disputed) to be the first forward pass in college football history.  That same year, "Schabie" scored seven touchdowns in a 107–0 win over Pittsburg Normal.

Schabinger's mentor and coach at the College of Emporia was Bill Hargiss.

As a coach
Schabinger was the eighth head football coach at Ottawa University in Ottawa, Kansas, serving four seasons, from 1915 to 1919, and compiling a record of 9–17–5.

Head coaching record

Football

Basketball

References

External links
 
 

1889 births
1972 deaths
American football quarterbacks
American men's basketball coaches
Basketball coaches from Kansas
College of Emporia Fighting Presbies football players
Creighton Bluejays athletic directors
Creighton Bluejays men's basketball coaches
Emporia State Hornets basketball coaches
Naismith Memorial Basketball Hall of Fame inductees
National Collegiate Basketball Hall of Fame inductees
Ottawa Braves basketball coaches
Ottawa Braves football coaches
People from Sabetha, Kansas
Players of American football from Kansas